Gargur (also Romanized as Gargūr and Gargoor; also known as Gargūr-e Meyān, and Gargūr-e Mīān) is a village in Delvar Rural District, Delvar District, Tangestan County, Bushehr Province, Iran. At the 2006 census, its population was 795, in 161 families.

References 

Populated places in Tangestan County